The school shark (Galeorhinus galeus) is a houndshark of the family Triakidae, and the only member of the genus Galeorhinus. Common names also include tope, tope shark, snapper shark, and soupfin shark. It feeds both in midwater and near the seabed, and its reproduction is ovoviviparous. This shark is caught in fisheries for its flesh, its fins, and its liver, which has a very high vitamin A content. The IUCN has classified this species as critically endangered in its Red List of Threatened Species.

Description
The school shark is a small, shallow-bodied shark with an elongated snout. The large mouth is crescent-shaped and the teeth are of a similar size and shape in both jaws. They are triangular-shaped, small, and flat, set at an oblique angle facing backwards, serrated and with a notch. The spiracles are small. The first dorsal fin is triangular with a straight leading edge and is set just behind the pectoral fins. The second dorsal fin is about the same size as the anal fin and is set immediately above it. The terminal lobe of the caudal fin has a notch in it and is as long as the rest of the fin. School sharks are dark bluish grey on their upper (dorsal) surfaces and white on their bellies (ventral surface). Juveniles have black markings on their fins.

Distribution
It occurs in the Northeast Atlantic and Mediterranean Sea, where it is uncommon and the Southwest Atlantic where it occurs between Patagonia and southern Brazil. It also occurs around the coast of Namibia and South Africa. It is present in the Northeast Pacific where it occurs between British Columbia and Baja California, and in the Southeast Pacific off Chile and Peru. It also occurs round the southern coasts of Australia, including Tasmania, and New Zealand.

Behaviour
The school shark is a migratory species. Animals tagged in the United Kingdom have been recovered in the Azores, the Canary Islands, and Iceland. Tagged individuals in Australia have travelled distances of  along the coast and others have turned up in New Zealand.

The school shark feeds primarily on fish. Examination of stomach contents of fish caught off California showed that they were opportunistic feeders, consuming whatever fish were most available. Their diet was predominantly sardines, midshipmen, flatfish, rockfish, and squid. Feeding is done both in open water and near the seabed as sardines and squid are pelagic animals, while the remainder are benthic species.

The school shark is ovoviviparous; its eggs are fertilised internally and remain in the uterus where the developing foetus feeds on the large yolk sac. The gestation period is about one year and the number of developing pups carried varies with the size of the mother, averaging between about 28 and 38. Pups in the same litter may have different sires, possibly because females are able to store sperm for a long time after mating. The females have traditional "pupping" areas in sheltered bays and estuaries where the young are born. The juvenile fish remain in these nursery areas when the adults move off to deeper waters.

Uses

The meat of the school shark is consumed in Andalusian cuisine, where it is usually known as cazón. Among recipes are the traditional cazón en adobo in the mainland, and tollos in the Canary Islands. In Mexican cuisine, the term cazón refers to other species, and is prepared similarly. In the United Kingdom, the flesh is sometimes used in "fish and chips" as a substitute for the more usual cod or haddock.
In Greek cuisine,  it is known as galéos (γαλέος) and usually is served with skordalia (σκορδαλιά), a dip made of mashed potatoes or wet white bread, with mashed garlic and olive oil.

Before 1937, the school shark was caught in California to supply a local market for shark fillet, and the fins were dried and sold in eastern Asia. Around that date, laboratory tests on its liver showed that it was higher in vitamin A content than any other fish tested. Subsequent to this discovery, it became the subject of a much larger-scale fishery which developed as a result of the high prices obtainable for the fish and its liver. It became the main source of supply for vitamin A in the United States during World War II, but was overexploited, populations were reduced, and the numbers of fish caught dwindled. Its oil was replaced by a similar product from the spotted spiny dogfish (Squalus suckleyi) and subsequently by lower-potency fish oils from Mexico and South America.

The school shark, along with the gummy shark, is the most important species in the southern Australian commercial fishery.  It is fished throughout its range and heavily exploited.

Conservation status
The IUCN lists the school shark as critically endangered in its Red List of Threatened Species. Although it is widely distributed, it is threatened by overexploitation in many parts of its range, where it is targeted for its liver oil, flesh, and fins. It is caught primarily by gillnets and longline fishing and to a lesser extent by trawling. Pups are sometimes caught inshore and some nursery areas are subject to siltation and their habitat may become degraded. Deep-sea cables and the magnetic field caused by the current flow may disrupt migration routes.

In 2010, Greenpeace International added the school shark to its seafood red list. In June 2018 the New Zealand Department of Conservation classified the school shark as "Not Threatened" with the qualifiers "Conservation Dependent" and "Threatened Overseas" under the New Zealand Threat Classification System.

References

External links

school shark
Fish of the Mediterranean Sea
Marine fish of Europe
Marine fauna of Oceania
Marine fauna of North America
Marine fauna of South America
Southeastern South American coastal fauna
Western North American coastal fauna
Marine fauna of Southern Africa
Vertebrates of Southern Africa
Ovoviviparous fish
Vulnerable fish
Vulnerable biota of Africa
Vulnerable fauna of Asia
Vulnerable biota of Europe
Vulnerable fauna of Oceania
Vulnerable biota of South America
school shark
Taxa named by Carl Linnaeus